Ali Khamis Seif (born 8 April 1954) is a Tanzanian CUF politician and Member of Parliament for Mkoani constituency since 2005.

References

Living people
1954 births
Civic United Front MPs
Tanzanian MPs 2005–2010
Tanzanian MPs 2010–2015
Fidel Castro Secondary School alumni
Zanzibari politicians